St Neots Rowing Club (SNRC) is a British Rowing affiliated club in the town of St Neots, Cambridgeshire, situated on a beautiful 4 km section of the River Great Ouse. It was founded in 1865.

History
Training for competitive rowing is believed to have started in St Neots in 1865 with the first recorded open regatta held on August Bank Holiday in 1874. They were very successful and popular events and continued annually until 1882.

St Neots Rowing Club is one of the most successful clubs in the country for producing junior international rowers. The Club has provided a member of the Great Britain squad for the World Junior Championships ten times – winning two gold medals and two bronze medals. In 2010, Bethany Astell and Philippa Neill both won a gold medal in the Women’s Eight at the World Junior Championships, taking the club’s count of world champions to three.

The Club’s first ever world champion, Jacqui Round, came about when she won gold in the Women’s Eight at the World Under-23 Championships in 2009. Jacqui had competed at another two World Under-23 Championships prior to her victory in 2009, winning a bronze medal in 2008. Jacqui also won two gold medals at the Youth Olympics. This feat was repeated a couple of years later by Jo Fitzsimons at the same venue.

On top of this, St Neots have provided eleven rowers for the Great Britain squad in the annual GB vs France J16 Match, and 21 rowers for crews in the Home Countries International, including five winning gold medals in 2009.

Facilities
SNRC has a large boathouse (rebuilt after severe gales in 1976 which completely demolished the boathouse and destroyed the club's fleet of boats) The Club rows on a 4 km stretch of the River Great Ouse and races in eights, fours, quads, doubles, pairs and single sculls with a fleet of excellent racing shells and several training boats.

The club has produced multiple British champions.

Honours

British champions

See also
 British Rowing

References

External links
 Official website

Sports clubs established in 1865
1865 establishments in England
Rowing clubs in England
Rowing Club
Sport in Huntingdonshire
Rowing clubs of the River Great Ouse